General elections were held in the Territory of Curaçao on 17 November 1941. Ten of the fifteen seats in the Estates of Curaçao were elected, with the remaining five appointed by the governor G.J.J. Wouters. The ten elected seats consisted of six for Curaçao, two for Aruba, one for Bonaire and one for the SSS Islands

From a population of 107,891 (December 1940) only 3,953 men, less than 4% of the population, were entitled to vote in the elections.

Curaçao 
Only one list of candidates was registered for the election on the island of Curaçao. It was the list of the Curaçaoan Roman Catholic Party (CRKP).

Population: 67,317 (31 December 1940)
Entitled to vote: 2,453
Valid votes: 1,477
Invalid votes: 85

Aruba 
Population: 30,614 (31 December 1940)
Entitled to vote: 1,323
Valid votes: 1,167

Bonaire 
Population: 5,616 (31 December 1940)
Entitled to vote: 76

Only one list of candidates was registered for the election on Bonaire. On it were two candidates:
 John Aniceto de Jongh (elected)
 Mauricio Marchena

The seat for Bonaire therefore went automatically to the first candidate of the list.

SSS Islands 
Entitled to vote: 101

William Rufus Plantz was the only candidate so the seat for the SSS Islands went automatically to him.

Appointed by the governor 
Governor Wouters assigned 
 Jacob Rudolf Arends
 Ernesto Cecilio Martijn
 Salomon Alfred Senior
 Frederik Augustus Vromans
 Carel Nicolaas Winkel 
to become members of the Estates. After Winkel resigned in 1944 because of health problems, governor P.A. Kasteel appointed Willem Pieter Maal as a new member of the Estates.

Aftermath 
The governor decided that Sprockel was the speaker of the parliament and Winkel the deputy speaker. Senior became the deputy speaker after Winkel left the parliament.

The new session of the Estates started on the first Tuesday of April 1942. Incumbent members who remained a member were: Da Costa Gomez, Sprockel, Desertine, Kroon, De Jongh, Plantz, Arends, Martijn, Senior, Vromans and Winkel

References 
 Amigoe di Curaçao, 18 November 1941
 Amigoe di Curacao, 27 November 1941

Elections in the Netherlands Antilles
Curacao